Laurent Weber (born 1 September 1972) is a French former professional footballer who played as a goalkeeper. During a 15-year playing career, he represented numerous clubs in the top two divisions of French football, making over 250 senior league appearances.

External links
 
 

1972 births
Living people
Sportspeople from Colmar
French footballers
Association football goalkeepers
RC Strasbourg Alsace players
Louhans-Cuiseaux FC players
Valenciennes FC players
SC Bastia players
ES Troyes AC players
AS Beauvais Oise players
AS Nancy Lorraine players
FC Istres players
Stade de Reims players
Ligue 1 players
Ligue 2 players
Championnat National players
Footballers from Alsace